Jules Raymond Rossignol (24 November 1869 – 4 August 1955) was a French fencer. He competed in the individual foil masters event at the 1900 Summer Olympics, finishing 5th.

References

External links
 

1869 births
1955 deaths
French male foil fencers
Olympic fencers of France
Fencers at the 1900 Summer Olympics
Sportspeople from Tarn (department)
Place of death missing